1st Lt. Walter Haut (June 3, 1922 – December 15, 2005) was the public information officer (PIO) at the 509th Bomb Group based in Roswell, New Mexico during 1947.  Early on July 8, 1947 he was ordered by the base commander, Colonel William Blanchard, to draft a press release to the public, announcing that the United States Army Air Forces had recovered a crashed "flying disc" from a nearby ranch. The press release garnered widespread national and even international media attention. The U.S. Army Air Force retracted the claim later the same day, saying instead that a weather balloon had been recovered.  Haut also received some criticism and ridicule in the nation's press for putting out the original press release.  The series of events eventually became known as the Roswell UFO incident.

When interviewed about the incident decades later, he claimed only a minor role, but he expressed his belief that there was "no chance" senior officers who handled the recovered material, including base commander Blanchard, mistook a weather balloon for a flying saucer.

After his death, he later claimed greater involvement in a video taped in 2000, stating seeing alien corpses and a craft at a base hangar and handling the strange crash debris.

Biography 

Walter Haut was born in Chicago, Illinois on June 3, 1922.  During World War II, he was a bombardier flying 35 missions against Japan.  At Operation Crossroads, the A-bomb tests at the Bikini atoll in the summer of 1946, he dropped instrument packages to record data from the bomb blasts.  In 1947, he became the public information officer for the 509th Atomic Bomb Group at Roswell Army Air Field in New Mexico.  The base commander, Colonel William H. Blanchard, was a close personal friend.

In 1991, Haut and two other men founded the International UFO Museum and Research Center in Roswell, New Mexico where he presided as president until 1996. Haut died on December 15, 2005 at the age of eighty-three.

Haut and the Roswell UFO incident

In the first book on the subject, The Roswell Incident, Haut was said to be "not a witness."(p. 72) He told interviewers in 1979 that base commander Colonel William Blanchard asked him to write and distribute the press release, but when Haut asked to see the object in question, he was told "his request was impossible." (p. 73)

In UFO Crash at Roswell, Haut appears as a witness, though not to any of actual debris. During a March 1989 interview he said he knew "nothing" about what was recovered. (p. 139) He described being asked by Blanchard to write the press release. "I didn't hear about it until, I guess, Jess [Jesse Marcel, head intelligence officer, who initially investigated and recovered some of the debris] was on his way to the flightline." (ibid) He did, however, describe what Marcel told him: "It was something he had never seen and didn't believe it was of this planet. I trusted him on his knowledge." (p. 142) He further stated: "I think there was a giant cover-up on this thing." (p. 143)

In an affidavit signed May 14, 1993, he repeated the above claimed sequence of events and added "I believe Col. Blanchard saw the material, because he sounded positive about what the material was. There is no chance he would have mistaken it for a weather balloon. Neither is there any chance that Major Marcel would have been mistaken."

By this time, Haut, along with Max Littell and Glenn Dennis, had opened the International UFO Museum and Research Center.

Then, in a recorded interview from 2000 with Wendy Connors and Dennis Balthauser, Haut claimed to have personally viewed an extraterrestrial or alien craft and a body in a Roswell Army Air Field base hangar, and being present at a senior staff meeting where a cover-up of events was discussed.  Haut also placed Brigadier General Roger M. Ramey, head of the Eighth Army Air Force in Fort Worth, Texas, at the meeting.  Ramey would later tell the press it was in fact a misidentified weather balloon after Haut had put out the press release of the recovered "flying disc."

In December 2002, Haut also signed a sealed affidavit in which he went into more details about the craft, debris, bodies, and cover-up.  Both the interview and affidavit were not to be released until after his death in 2005.

The full text of the affidavit was first published in June 2007 in the book Witness to Roswell: Unmasking the 60 Year Cover-Up.<ref>Witness to Roswell by Tom J. Carey and Donald R. Schmitt</ref>  According to the authors, Haut had sworn to his friend Colonel Blanchard not to reveal in his lifetime the events he witnessed and therefore told researchers either that he couldn't remember or that he had only prepared and released the information that was given to him at the time and denied he knew anything else.

In his affidavit, Haut stated that on July 8, 1947, following the press release he put out in the afternoon, he was taken out to a base hangar by Colonel Blanchard.  There he saw an egg-shaped craft about 15 feet long and several small bodies about four feet tall with large heads.  He was convinced the bodies were alien and had come from a crashed spacecraft.

Haut also stated that there had been two major crash sites that he had become aware of the day before, the first a large debris field about 75 miles northwest of Roswell (the site investigated by Major Marcel), and the second, about 40 miles north of town, where the main craft and bodies were found.  The north site had just been found by civilians on July 7, and apparently word had already gotten out about it in the public.

At the staff morning meeting on July 8, which Haut said he attended, key officers at the base were briefed and strange debris was handed around, which nobody could identify.  Haut also said there was a discussion as to what the public was to be told. General Ramey had flown in to attend the meeting. Haut said Ramey suggested telling the public about the more distant debris field as a diversion from the more accessible and important body/craft site.  He felt Ramey was following orders from The Pentagon.  Haut added he was not aware at the time exactly what information was to be divulged.  But the press release he put out a few hours later spoke of the more distant site in general terms, saying that the Army Air Force had come into possession of a "flying disc" with cooperation of a local rancher, and it was being flown on to "higher headquarters" after being examined at the base.  "Higher headquarters" quickly turned out to be Gen. Ramey in Fort Worth, who within a few hours said the "flying disc" was a misidentified weather balloon.

See also
Roswell Incident
UFO

Notes

Sources

 The Truth About the Crash at Roswell, Kevin D. Randle & Donald R. Schmitt, Avon Books, 1994.
 Witness to Roswell: unmasking the 60-year cover-up'', Thomas J. Carey & Donald R. Schmitt, New Page Books, 2007.
 Obituary
 The Evening Standard
 December 26, 2002 Affidavit
 Dead Airman's Affidavit: Roswell Aliens Were Real

1922 births
2005 deaths
United States Army Air Forces officers
United States Army Air Forces personnel of World War II
Roswell incident